Parmentiera dressleri is a species of plant in the family Bignoniaceae. It is endemic to Panama and Costa Rica.  It is threatened by habitat loss.

References

Flora of Panama
dressleri
Endangered plants
Taxonomy articles created by Polbot